Dolotskoye is a rural locality (a village) and the administrative center of Mezzhenskoye Rural Settlement, Ustyuzhensky District, Vologda Oblast, Russia. The population was 500 as of 2002. There are 10 streets.

Geography 
Mikhalyovo is the nearest rural locality.

References 

Rural localities in Ustyuzhensky District